Imee Ooi FRSA is a Chinese-Malaysian record producer, composer, and singer who composes and arranges music for classic Buddhist chant, mantra and dharani. She performs her compositions in Sanskrit, Pali, Tibetan and Mandarin. In 1997 she founded a record label, I.M.M. Musicworks, to publish her music. She has released more than 50 albums (55 between 1998 and 2020).

Ooi also composed and directed three highly acclaimed stage musicals: Siddhartha, Above Full Moon, and Princess Wen Cheng (aka Jewel of Tibet).

Biography
Ooi was born in Taiping, Malaysia to a musically-inclined Hoklo family. Her grandfather, who was a writer and dramatist, emigrated to Malaysia from Guangdong, China. Ooi's mother was a piano teacher; Imee and her four siblings all learned piano. Ooi continued her study of piano and trained as a classical pianist.

Filmography

Musicals

Discography

All songs composed, produced, and some performed by Imee Ooi arranged by Praveen maddhali

Solo albums

Soundtracks

References

External links
 Meet Imee the mantra musician
 I.M.M. Music Works
 An interview by 劉潔芬 in Chinese: 俗世慧音

Living people
Malaysian Buddhists
Malaysian people of Chinese descent
21st-century Malaysian women singers
20th-century Malaysian women singers
Performers of Buddhist music
Malaysian composers
1964 births